Hum hum från Humlegårn is a song written by Ragnar Borgedahl and recorded by him on the 1974 album Hum hum från Humlegårn. Lars Winnerbäck and Hovet recorded the song releasing it as a single on 14 July 2003. scoring a Svensktoppen hit for 25 weeks between 17 August 2003.-1 February 2004 before leaving chart.

The song is also used in the 2004 film "Hum, hum från Humlegårn" Håkan Bråkan & Josef (2004).

Charts

Lars Winnerbäck & Hovet version

References

1974 songs
Swedish songs
Lars Winnerbäck songs
Swedish-language songs